Choqa Balak or Chaqa Balak may refer to:
 Choqa Balak-e Chalab Zard
 Choqa Balak-e Harqorush